Two ships of the United States Navy have been named Case, in honor of Rear Admiral Augustus Case.  

United States Navy ship names